The Naresuan-class frigate is an enlarged modified version of the Chinese-made Type 053 frigate with Western weaponry, cooperatively designed by the Royal Thai Navy and China but built by the China State Shipbuilding Corporation in Shanghai. The ships came at 2 billion baht each, less than the 8 billion baht claimed price tag for Western-built frigates.

Ships in the class

Upgrade
On 3 June 2011, Saab announced that it was awarded a contract for the upgrading of the two Naresuan-class frigates. The scope of the upgrade will include Saab's 9LV MK4 combat management system, Sea Giraffe AMB, CEROS 200 fire control radar, EOS 500 electro-optics system and data link systems for communications with the newly acquired Royal Thai Air Force Erieye surveillance aircraft.

References

External links 

 
Frigate classes